Gregory Billington (born May 30, 1989) is an American triathlete. He was born in the United States and raised in Six Mile Bottom, England. He traveled a lot in his youth when his father served as instructor on U.S. military bases. He started competing in triathlon aged 10 and placed 37th at the 2016 Rio Olympics.

After retiring from elite-level triathlon, he has continued his elite-level athleticism, participating in marathons, winning two marathons in 2019 and participating in the 2020 Olympic Marathon Trials, finishing 37th at 2:17:21.

Billington followed it up by returning to triathlon as a guide to Brad Snyder at the Paratriathlon PTVI category, winning the 2020 Summer Paralympics gold, as sighted guides are eligible for medals.

References

External links

 

1989 births
Living people
American male triathletes
Olympic triathletes of the United States
Triathletes at the 2016 Summer Olympics
Medalists at the 2020 Summer Paralympics
Paralympic gold medalists for the United States